Best of The Doobies is the first greatest hits album by the Doobie Brothers. The album has material from Toulouse Street through Takin' It to the Streets, and is also a diamond record. The album was released by Warner Bros. Records on October 29, 1976, and has been re-released numerous times.

Track listing 
Side one
 "China Grove" (Tom Johnston) – 3:14
 "Long Train Runnin'" (Johnston) – 3:23
 "Takin' It to the Streets" (Michael McDonald) – 3:36 
 "Listen to the Music" (Johnston) – 3:49 
 "Black Water" (Patrick Simmons) – 4:14
 "Rockin' Down the Highway" (Johnston) – 3:19
Side two
 "Jesus Is Just Alright" (Arthur Reid Reynolds) – 4:30
 "It Keeps You Runnin'" (McDonald) – 4:20
 "South City Midnight Lady" (Simmons) – 5:27
 "Take Me in Your Arms" (Holland–Dozier–Holland) – 3:39
 "Without You" (John Hartman, Michael Hossack, Johnston, Tiran Porter, Simmons) – 4:58

Personnel 
 Tom Johnston – guitars, vocals, harmonica on "Long Train Runnin'"
 Michael McDonald – keyboards and vocals on "Takin' It to the Streets" and "It Keeps You Runnin'"
 Patrick Simmons – guitars, vocals, lead vocals on "Black Water", "South City Midnight Lady", "Jesus Is Just Alright", banjo and co-lead vocals on "Listen to the Music"
 Jeff "Skunk" Baxter – guitars, pedal steel guitar
 Tiran Porter – bass guitar, vocals
 Michael Hossack – drums
 John Hartman – drums
 Keith Knudsen – drums on "Take Me in Your Arms", "Takin' It to the Streets" and "It Keeps You Runnin'", vocals

Charts

Certifications

See also 
 List of best-selling albums in the United States

Notes

References 

1976 greatest hits albums
Albums produced by Ted Templeman
The Doobie Brothers compilation albums
Warner Records compilation albums